Catocala puerpera is a moth of the family Erebidae first described by Michel-Esprit Giorna in 1791. It is found in Mediterranean and sub-Mediterranean areas of the Near East and Middle East and in North Africa.

There is one generation per year. Adults are on wing from May to June.

The larvae feed on Populus euphratica.

Subspecies
Catocala puerpera puerpera
Catocala puerpera rosea Austaut, 1884 (Algeria)
Catocala puerpera pallida Alphéraky, 1887 (Transcaspia, Xinjiang)
Catocala puerpera syriaca Schultz, 1909 (Israel)

References

External links

Fauna Europaea
Lepiforum e.V.

puerpera
Moths of Europe
Moths of Africa
Moths of Asia
Moths described in 1791